The Defense Visual Information Distribution Service (DVIDS), formerly the "Defense Video & Imagery Distribution System," is an operation supported by the Defense Media Activity (DMA). It provides a connection between world media and the American military personnel serving at home and abroad. It supports all branches of the U.S. military as well as its coalition partners in the Central Command (CENTCOM) area of responsibility.

Operations
A network of portable Ku-band satellite transmitters in a hub in Atlanta, Georgia, and other locations, feed DVIDS with PR and combat content, including live video feeds. DVIDS broadcasts videos, photographs, podcasts, audio, webcasts, interviews, and print products (e.g., publications).

The service currently uses Aspera software for its data and imagery transmission and storage needs. It operates DefenseTV, a military television-channel accessed through FireTV, Chromecast or Roku,  and offers the Military 24/7 mobile app, which delivers news, video, and photos supplied directly by deployed service members.  It maintains an archive for ongoing operations in Iraq, Afghanistan, Kuwait, Qatar and Bahrain.

Scott Betts leads the Department of Defense DVIDS program via Defense Media Activity, Defense Enterprise Media Systems (DEMS), at Fort Meade, MD.

See also
Iraq War
War in Afghanistan (2001–present)
Psychological warfare
Public relations

Notes

External links

DVIDS, Public Affairs Officers' qualification course, Defense Information School
Photographs by DVIDS in Wikipedia Commons

Mass media of the military of the United States
Public relations